refers to the sprinkling of water in Japanese gardens and streets. It is more than a mere matter of hygiene and has, in temples and gardens, a ritual or contemplative purpose. In streets in summer, it serves to cool the immediate area, keep down dust, and also please neighbors. Japanese people see uchimizu as exemplifying national values as it combines utilitarian, aesthetic, courteous, and dutiful ends .

Traditionally, this was done with a bucket and ladle and the sprinkler would wear a yukata or summer kimono. In its more modern forms, various green groups have used the Internet to encourage people in Japan to do uchimizu with recycled water as a form of environmentally aware public courtesy.

References

External links 
 Site explaining this custom for foreigners (in English)

Gardening in Japan
Japanese values
Water and society
Water in Japan